is a former Japanese football player.

Playing career
Hayashi was born in Hofu on June 27, 1978. After graduating from high school, he joined J1 League club Gamba Osaka in 1997. However he could hardly play in the match. In September 1999, he moved to J2 League club Consadole Sapporo. However he could hardly play in the match. Although he returned to Gamba in 2000, he could not play at all in the match. In 2001, he moved to J2 club Kawasaki Frontale. Although he played many matches in 2001, his opportunity to play decreased from 2002. In 2004, he moved to J2 club Montedio Yamagata. He played many matches as substitute forward in 4 seasons. He retired end of 2007 season.

Club statistics

References

External links

1978 births
Living people
Association football people from Yamaguchi Prefecture
Japanese footballers
J1 League players
J2 League players
Gamba Osaka players
Hokkaido Consadole Sapporo players
Kawasaki Frontale players
Montedio Yamagata players
Association football forwards